The Scout and Guide movement in the State of Palestine  is served by the Palestinian Scout Association, member of the World Organization of the Scout Movement and the World Association of Girl Guides and Girl Scouts. The Scout and Guide movement in the State of Palestine can be traced back to the earliest times in Scouting.

The Girl Guides of Palestine, formerly working towards World Association of Girl Guides and Girl Scouts membership, are no longer active.

International Scouting units in Palestine
In addition, there are American Boy Scouts in Gaza, serving as Lone Scouts linked to the Direct Service branch of the Boy Scouts of America, which supports units around the world.

See also

 Israel Boy and Girl Scouts Federation

References